Yelkhovka is a rural locality (a village) in Niginskoye Rural Settlement, Nikolsky District, Vologda Oblast, Russia. The population was 40 as of 2002.

Geography 
Yelkhovka is located 39 km northwest of Nikolsk (the district's administrative centre) by road. Krasavino is the nearest rural locality.

References 

Rural localities in Nikolsky District, Vologda Oblast